Eerwah Vale is a locality split between the Sunshine Coast Region and Shire of Noosa, both in Queensland, Australia. In the  Eerwah Vale had a population of 621 people.

Geography 
Part of the northern boundary is marked by the North Maroochy River.

The Bruce Highway passes through the east of Eerwah Vale. East of the Bruce Highway within the locality is Main Camp Road.  Mount Eerwah is centrally located and protected within the Mount Eerwah Conservation Park.

History 

The township was originally known as Eerwah, after its nearby summit, Mount Eerwah. In 1890 the name of the Eerwah Post Office was changed to Mount Eerwah Post Office. This post office serviced Main Camp during the construction of the Caboolture to Gympie section of the North Coast railway line. It was run by Mr Edward H Arundell.

The first Mount Eerwah Provisional School No. 619 (1890 to 1891) was for the children of railway construction workers.

After the railway line was completed settlement moved closer to the new Eumundi Railway Station.

Mount Eerwah State School No. 1399 (22 July 1913 to 31 May 1917) was situated on the Eumundi Kenilworth Road (opposite Ceylon Road). This area was known as "Koojarewon" but a State School of a similar name existed at Highfields, near Toowoomba, so it changed to Mount Eerwah. This school building was later moved to become the Brown's Creek Provisional School.

Brown's Creek State School No. 1156 opened on 29 January 1918 and closed on 23 August 1936. This school was located on the south side of King Creek near its junction with Browns Creek, in the locality currently called Eerwah Vale.

The first mention of Eerwah Vale locality is in relation to the local residents unanimously deciding to build a public hall at 'Eerwah Vale.'

Eerwah Vale Provisional School opened on 15 June 1925. In 1932 it became Eerwah Vale State School. It closed in 1963. It was at 438 Eumundi Kenilworth Road.

At the  Eerwah Vale had a population of 527 people.

In the  Eerwah Vale had a population of 621 people.

Education
There are no schools in Eerwah Vale. The nearest primary schools are Eumundi State School in neighbouring Eumundi to the east, Cooroy State School in neighbouring Cooroy to the north, North Arm State School in neighbouring North Arm to the south-east, and Yandina State School in Yandina to the south-east. The nearest secondary schools are Noosa District State High School which has its junior campus in Pomona to the north-west and its senior campus in neighbouring Cooroy to the north and Nambour State College in Nambour to the south.

Notable flora 
Planchonella eerwah or Pouteria eerwah – Shiny-leaved Condoo, Black Plum, Wild Apple. This species is listed as endangered by the Australian and Queensland Governments.

References

External links
 

Suburbs of the Sunshine Coast Region
Localities in Queensland
Suburbs of Noosa Shire, Queensland